The French-American Foundation is a privately funded, non-governmental organization established to promote bilateral relations between France and the United States on topics of importance to the two countries, with a focus on contact between upcoming leaders from each country. It employs a variety of initiatives that include multi-year policy programs, conferences on issues of French-American interest, and leadership and professional exchanges of decision-makers from France and the United States.

Founded in 1976, the Foundation is an operating organization that relies on outside financial support to carry out its mission and does not provide grants. It is an independent, non-partisan, nonprofit organization.

History 
The idea was born in 1973 between Ambassador James G. Lowenstein, James Chace, editor-in-chief of Foreign Affairs, both members of the Council on Foreign Relations, an independent think tank, and Nicholas Wahl, a specialist of post-war France at Princeton University. In order to counter an anti-French sentiment within the State Department, the Senate Committee on Foreign Relations and the press, as well as anti-Americanism among the French elite, the three men grew the desire to create a structure dedicated to friendship between the US and its oldest ally, and outside government control, unlike the existing exchange programs led by the State Department since 1941.

Young Leaders 
The Young Leaders program is the flagship program of the French-American Foundation. The program was created in 1981, under the sponsorship of Princeton French-American economist  who remained its president until 2000. It was initially intended as a response to observations that the close working relationships between French and American leaders in the post-war period were waning as new, younger leaders rose with little exposure to their transatlantic counterparts. 38 years later, it still plays a key role in the creation of transatlantic bonds, with more than 500 leaders in government, business, media, military, culture and the non-profit sector having taken part.

Every year, juries in France and the United States select a small group (around twenty) of French and Americans between 30 and 40, that are destined to hold a leadership position in their field and to play an important role in a globalized world. The selected Young Leaders then participate in two five-day seminars, alternatively in the U.S. and France, with the opportunity to discuss issues of common concern and, more importantly, get to know each other and create durable bonds.

Notable alumni 
Young Leaders alumni include prominent Americans such as:

 Former President Bill Clinton
 Former Presidential candidate Hillary Clinton
 Executive Dina Powell 
 Los Angeles Mayor Eric Garcetti
 Senator Evan Bayh
 Senator Bill Bradley
 Entrepreneur Auren Hoffman
 General Wesley Clark
 Former White House Chief of Staff Joshua Bolten
 Former World Bank president Robert Zoellick
 Filmmaker Charles Ferguson
 Frank Herringer, Transamerica Corporation
 John Thain, CIT Group
 Journalist Gwen Ifill

French honorees include:

 President Emmanuel Macron
 Former Prime Minister Edouard Philippe
 Former President François Hollande
 Astronaut Thomas Pesquet 
 Pierre Moscovici
 Arnaud Montebourg
 Najat Vallaud-Belkacem
 Fleur Pellerin 
 Former Prime Minister Alain Juppé
 Henri de Castries, AXA
 Alexandre de Juniac, Air France-KLM
 Michel Combes, Alcatel-Lucent
 Frédéric Lemoine, Wendel
 Anne Lauvergeon, former chairperson & CEO of AREVA
 Michel Bon, former CEO of France Télécom

Annual Gala 

The Annual Gala is the principal fundraising event of the French-American Foundation. Each year at the Gala, the Foundation presents its Benjamin Franklin Award to two individuals who have made significant contributions to the French-American relationship. The Comte de Vergennes Award is presented to longtime supporters of the French-American Foundation.

Past honorees include: Anne Lauvergeon, Patricia Russo, Ambassador Anne Cox Chambers, Henri de Castries, John A. Thain, Hon. C. Douglas Dillon, Hon. Walter J. P. Curley, Médecins Sans Frontières, Bernard Arnault, Michel David-Weill, the Forbes family, Maurice Lévy, and Frederick W. Smith.

See also
 France–United States relations

References

External links
 Official web site

 
Organizations established in 1976
France–United States relations